Jude Tallichet (born 1954) is an American sculptor. She was born in Louisville, Kentucky and lives in Queens, New York. She attended the University of Montana. In 1990 she was the recipient of a MacDowell fellowship. Tallichet is a professor emeritus of the Tyler School of Art.

Her work is included in the permanent collections of the Denver Art Museum and the Phoenix Art Museum.

References

External links
 Official website

1954 births
Living people
20th-century American women artists
21st-century American women artists
American sculptors
Artists from Louisville, Kentucky